DPMA is an acronym that may refer to:
 Data Processing Management Association, now Association of Information Technology Professionals
 Deutsches Patent- und Markenamt, the German Patent and Trade Mark Office 
 Division de police maritime et aéroportuaire